Grevillea asteriscosa, commonly known as star-leaf grevillea, is a species of flowering plant in the family Proteaceae and is endemic to the south-west of Western Australia. It is a shrub with widely-spreading branches, star-shaped leaves with sharply-pointed lobes, and bright red flowers.

Description

Taxonomy
Grevillea asteriscola was formally described in 1904 by German botanist Ludwig Diels in Botanische Jahrbücher für Systematik, Pflanzengeschichte und Pflanzengeographie, based on plant material collected about 150 kilometres north of the Stirling Range. The specific epithet (asteriscosa) means "abounding in little stars".

Distribution and habitat
Star-leaf grevillea grows in heath and scrub between Muntadgin, Pingaring and Bullaring in the Avon Wheatbelt and Mallee biogeographic regions of south-western Western Australia.

Conservation status
This grevillea is listed as "Priority Four" by the Government of Western Australia Department of Biodiversity, Conservation and Attractions, meaning that is rare or near threatened.

References

asteriscosa
Eudicots of Western Australia
Proteales of Australia
Taxa named by Ludwig Diels
Plants described in 1904